Hyde and Hughes Publishing is a book publishing company.

Hyde & Hughes is an independent publisher of fine art books. For example, it published Chris Gollon: Humanity in Art by Tamsin Pickeral on the painter Chris Gollon in 2010.

References

External links
 Hyde and Hughes Publishing website

Book publishing companies of the United Kingdom
Visual arts publishing companies